Iñao National Park and Integrated Management Natural Area (complete Spanish title: Parque Nacional y Área Natural de Manejo Integrado Serranía del Iñao) is a protected area in the Chuquisaca Department Bolivia, situated in the provinces of Belisario Boeto, Tomina (Padilla Municipality), Hernando Siles (Monteagudo Municipality) and Luis Calvo  (Villa Vaca Guzmán Municipality).

References

External links 
 www.sernap.gov.bo / Parque Nacional y Área Natural de Manejo Integrado Serranía del Iñao (Spanish)

National parks of Bolivia
Geography of Chuquisaca Department
Protected areas established in 2004